The 1928 Walker Cup, the 5th Walker Cup Match, was played on August 30 and 31, 1928, at Chicago Golf Club, Wheaton, Illinois. The United States won by 11 matches to 1.

Format
Four 36-hole matches of foursomes were played on Thursday and eight singles matches on Friday. Each of the 12 matches was worth one point in the larger team competition. If a match was all square after the 36th hole extra holes were not played. The team with most points won the competition. If the two teams were tied, the previous winner would retain the trophy.

Teams
The United States picked their team of 8 in late-April. Great Britain and Ireland selected a team of 10 in mid-June. This team included Cyril Tolley but he withdrew at the end of the month and was replaced by Noel Martin. At his time Tolley had become involved in a libel action against J. S. Fry & Sons of Bristol, chocolate manufacturers who had produced an advert in which Tolley was caricatured.

United States

Playing captain: Bobby Jones
Chick Evans
Watts Gunn
Jimmy Johnston
Roland MacKenzie
Francis Ouimet
Jess Sweetser
George Von Elm

Great Britain & Ireland
 & 
Playing captain:  William Tweddell
 John Beck
 Ronald Hardman
 Charles Hezlet
 William Hope
 Archibald MacCallum
 Noel Martin
 Philip Perkins
 Eustace Storey
 Tony Torrance

Thursday's foursomes

Friday's singles

References

Walker Cup
Golf in Illinois
Walker Cup
Walker Cup
Walker Cup